Martin Patching (born 1 November 1958) is an English former professional footballer who played as a midfielder in the Football League for Wolverhampton Wanderers, Watford and Northampton Town, in non-League football for Dunstable, Staines Town and Hendon, and in Sunday league football for Hemel Hempstead Spinners. He was capped by the England schools team and the national youth team in 1977. Patching scouted for Watford and Nottingham Forest after retiring from playing. His son, Cauley Woodrow, is a professional footballer.

References

1958 births
Living people
Footballers from Rotherham
English footballers
England schools international footballers
England youth international footballers
Association football midfielders
Wolverhampton Wanderers F.C. players
Watford F.C. players
Northampton Town F.C. players
Dunstable Town F.C. players
Staines Town F.C. players
Hendon F.C. players
English Football League players
Isthmian League players
Watford F.C. non-playing staff
Nottingham Forest F.C. non-playing staff